Aubrey Kebonnetse (born 6 February 1990) is a Botswanan former footballer who is last known to have played as a striker for Dayton Flyers.

Career

Kebonnetse started his career with Botswanan side Township Rollers. Before the 2010 season, Kebonnetse joined the Dayton Flyers in the United States, where he suffered a knee injury.

References

External links
 

Botswana international footballers
Expatriate soccer players in the United States
Township Rollers F.C. players
Living people
1990 births
Association football forwards
Botswana footballers